Great Houghton is a village and civil parish in the Metropolitan Borough of Barnsley in South Yorkshire, England), on the border with West Yorkshire. It lies to the west of Thurnscoe, on the B6411 road, and is located at approximately 53° 33' 20" north, 1° 21' west, at an elevation of around 60 m above sea level. At the 2001 census it had a population of 2,261, increasing to 2,475 at the 2011 census.

Great Houghton is a former mining village and its mines were served by the railway, which has since gone, but remains are still visible.

The village has a primary school called Sandhill. The old school building that stood on the main street was demolished in 2007 and was replaced with a new Private Finance Initiative primary school.

Some parts of Great Houghton were affected by the 2007 summer flooding, which caused extensive damage in neighbouring villages.

References

External links

Villages in South Yorkshire
Geography of the Metropolitan Borough of Barnsley
Civil parishes in South Yorkshire